Lose Control may refer to:

Music

Albums
 Lose Control (album) or the title song, by Silk, 1992
 Lose Control (EP) or the title song (see below), by Lay, 2016
 Lose Control, by Ricky J, 2001

Songs
 "Lose Control" (Hedley song), 2016
 "Lose Control" (Kish Mauve song), 2008
 "Lose Control" (Lay song), 2016
 "Lose Control" (Meduza, Becky Hill and Goodboys song), 2019
 "Lose Control" (Missy Elliott song), 2005
 "Lose Control" (Waldo's People song), 2008
 "Lose Control (Let Me Down)", by Keri Hilson, 2011
 "Shinshoku (Lose Control)", by L'Arc-en-Ciel, 1998
 "Lose Control", by Ash from 1977
 "Lose Control", by the Courteeners from Anna
 "Lose Control", by Evanescence from The Open Door
 "Lose Control", by James from Gold Mother
 "Lose Control", by JJ Lin from Shang-Chi and the Legend of the Ten Rings: The Album
 "Lose Control", by Kevin Federline from Playing with Fire
 "Lose Control", by Matt Simons
 "Lose Control", by Motion City Soundtrack from Panic Stations
 "Lose Control", by Robyn & La Bagatelle Magique from Love Is Free
 "Lose Control", by the Saturdays from Wordshaker
 "Lose Control", by Timbaland from Shock Value II

Other uses
 Lose Control (TV programming block), a former programming block on Disney Channel India

See also
 Losing Control (disambiguation)
 Loses Control, a 2003 album by Hey Mercedes